Yoon Se-ah (born January 2, 1978) is a South Korean actress best known for her roles in The City Hall, Wife Returns, A Gentleman's Dignity, Stranger, Sky Castle, and Snowdrop. Yoon was paired with Korean-French-Canadian actor and model Julien Kang for the fourth season of reality show We Got Married. Dubbed the "KangYoon Couple" and "Juliah Couple" by fans, they appeared on the show from August 18, 2012, to March 2, 2013.

Personal life

Philanthropy 
On March 7, 2022, Yoon donated 10 million won to Korea Disaster Relief Association To help the victims of the massive forest fire that started in Uljin, Gyeongbuk and has spread to Samcheok, Gangwon.

On August 11, 2022, Yoon donated  to help those affected by the 2022 South Korean floods through the Hope Bridge Korea Disaster Relief Association.

On February 9, 2023, Yoon donated 10 million won to help 2023 Turkey–Syria earthquake, by donating money through World Vision for Earthquake Relief in Turkey and Syria.

Filmography

Film

Television series

Web series

Television show

Awards and nominations

References

External links

1978 births
Living people
South Korean television actresses
South Korean film actresses
L&Holdings artists
Yong In University alumni